We are fed up! (Wir haben es satt!) is the theme of a series of demonstrations in Germany against industrial livestock production and for more sustainable farming. The biggest demonstrations take place every year in Berlin since 2011 and attract up to 30,000 people. Around 120 different groups, which represent farmers, companies, and environmental rights and animal rights activists organize and sustain the demonstrations. The protests take place parallel to the Berlin International Green Week.

Overview
Independent from the protests in Berlin, demonstrations under a similar theme occurred in Amsterdam in 2012 and 2013. The event in the Netherlands was called we zijn het MEGA zat, which translates to "we are MEGA fed up" and is a reference to the scale of industrial livestock farming.

Gallery

See also
Meat Atlas – Facts and figures about the animals we eat

References

External links
 Website of the organisations that support and organize the We are fed up!-demonstrations

Protest marches
2010s in Berlin
2010s in Amsterdam
Protests in Germany
Protests in the European Union
Intensive farming
Protests in the Netherlands